Electric Earth is an EP released in 2002 by the New Zealand electronica duo, Pitch Black.

Track listing
Electric Earth (DC Mix)
Urbanoia (Small Town Mix)
Lizard Room (Ekto's Reptile Room Remix)

Pitch Black (band) albums
2002 EPs